HRI may refer to:

Airports 
 Hermiston Municipal Airport in Hermiston, Oregon, United States
 Mattala Rajapaksa International Airport in Sri Lanka

Businesses and organizations 
 Hawaii Reserves, a subsidiary of Deseret Management Corporation
 Herald Investment Trust, a British investment trust
 Horse Racing Ireland, the governing body of horse racing on the island of Ireland
 Horticulture Research International
 Hotel, Restaurant and Institutional Management
 Human Rights Initiative of North Texas, an American non-governmental organization
 Human Rights Internet, a Canadian non-governmental organization

Hospitals 
 Huddersfield Royal Infirmary, in the United Kingdom
 Hull Royal Infirmary, in the United Kingdom

Research institutes 
 Harish-Chandra Research Institute, in Allahabad, Uttar Pradesh, India
 Heart Research Institute, in Camperdown, New South Wales, Australia
 Harte Research Institute for Gulf of Mexico Studies, at Texas A&M University–Corpus Christi
 Heffter Research Institute, in New Mexico, United States

Other uses 
 Hri (Buddhism)
 Heme-regulated inhibitor kinase
 Human Readable Interpretation
 Human robot interaction
 Humanitarian Response Index